Scelodonta bidentata is a species of leaf beetle of Nigeria, Cameroon, the Republic of the Congo, the Democratic Republic of the Congo and Ivory Coast.. It was first described from Old Calabar by Joseph Sugar Baly in 1877.

References

Eumolpinae
Beetles of Africa
Beetles of the Democratic Republic of the Congo
Insects of West Africa
Insects of Cameroon
Insects of the Republic of the Congo
Beetles described in 1877
Taxa named by Joseph Sugar Baly